Todd Perry and Thomas Shimada were the defending champions but only Perry competed that year with Jordan Kerr.

Kerr and Perry lost in the quarterfinals to André Sá and Flávio Saretta.

Mariusz Fyrstenberg and Marcin Matkowski won in the final 6–2, 6–2 against Tomas Behrend and Leoš Friedl.

Seeds

  Lucas Arnold /  Mariano Hood (first round)
  Simon Aspelin /  Massimo Bertolini (quarterfinals)
  Martín García /  Sebastián Prieto (semifinals)
  Jordan Kerr /  Todd Perry (quarterfinals)

Draw

References
 2004 Brasil Open Doubles Draw

Doubles
Doubles